Richard de Coleton was Dean of Exeter between 1327 and 1335.

Notes

Deans of Exeter